SFK Rotalis, is a Lithuanian football club from the city of Vilnius.

History 

The team was founded in 2005. After playing in the local Vilnius league, the team started playing in the LFF II lyga from the year 2012.

Current squad
As of March 2016

Competition history 

 Lithuania
{|class="wikitable" style="text-align: center"
|-bgcolor="#efefef"
! Season
! Div.
! Pos.
! Pl.
! W
! D
! L
! Goals
! Pts
!Cup
|-
|align=center|2008
|align=center|4th
|align=center|6
|align=center|
|align=center|
|align=center|
|align=center|
|align=center|
|align=center|
|align=center|
|-
|align=center|2009
|align=center|4th
|align=center|5
|align=center|
|align=center|
|align=center|
|align=center|
|align=center|
|align=center|
|align=center| 
|-
|align=center|2010
|align=center|4th
|align=center|5
|align=center|
|align=center|
|align=center|
|align=center|
|align=center|
|align=center|
|align=center|
|-
|align=center|2011
|align=center|4th
|align=center|5
|align=center|
|align=center|
|align=center|
|align=center|
|align=center|
|align=center|
|align=center| 
|-
|align=center|2012
|align=center|3rd
|align=center|8
|align=center|22
|align=center|9
|align=center|3
|align=center|10
|align=center|31-32
|align=center|30
|align=center| 1/64 f.
|-
|align=center|2013
|align=center|3rd
|align=center|4
|align=center|24
|align=center|11
|align=center|7
|align=center|6
|align=center|38-31
|align=center|40
|align=center| 1/64 f.
|-
|align=center|2014
|align=center|3rd
|align=center|9
|align=center|26
|align=center|9
|align=center|5
|align=center|12
|align=center|31-43
|align=center|32
|align=center|
|-
|align=center|2015
|align=center|3rd
|align=center|2
|align=center|24
|align=center|12
|align=center|8
|align=center|4
|align=center|47-27
|align=center|44
|align=center| 1/64 f.
|}

References

External links
Official website 
Official statistic site  

 
Football clubs in Lithuania
Football clubs in Vilnius
Association football clubs established in 2005
2005 establishments in Lithuania